Pseudocollinia brintoni is a species of parasitoid ciliates of the Colliniidae family. P. brintoni infects a species of krill, Nyctiphanes simplex.

References

Oligohymenophorea
Protists described in 2012